Thomas Kukula (born 1965 in Düsseldorf) is a German DJ, Eurodance musician and music producer, that released music under monikers such as General Base, Candy Beat, T.H.K. and Red 5.

Life and career 
Kukula started working as a DJ in 1986 in his hometown Düsseldorf. Two years later he became resident DJ in the Tarm Center in Bochum. Soon he started to produce his own music. His first project was General Base.

The first General Base single Mein Gott, es ist voller Sterne was released in 1991. In 1992 he released his debut album First and the singles Back Again, Apache (a cover version of Apache by The Shadows from 1960), In Trance, Bidi, Bidi - Do You Wanna Dance, Marilyn Monroe and Poison.

The album First entered the German Media Control Charts in 1993 and reached number 82. The single Poison also became a hit, mainly due to the vocals of Claudja Barry.

Besides he also released as Candy Beat and T.H.K. Other projects were not that successful. In 1998 Kukula started his new project Red 5 and entered the German charts with the hit Da Beat Goes. He later changed the name to DJ Red 5. The follow-up singles I Love You Stop...!, For This World and Lift Me Up also entered the German charts.

Kukula also remixed tracks by Moby, Bass Bumpers, Maxx, The Good Men, Sequential One, Sheeva and United DJs.

He is living and working in Oberhausen.

Discography

Albums 
 1992: General Base - First
 1994: General Base - First (inkl. Poison mit Claudja Barry, Apache & Base of Love)
 1998: Red 5 - Forces

Singles

External links 
 Official website djred5.de

References 

1965 births
Club DJs
Eurodance musicians
German dance musicians
German DJs
German techno musicians
German trance musicians
Living people
Musicians from Düsseldorf
Electronic dance music DJs